The 1995–96 season of the Slovak Second Football League (also known as 2. liga) was the third season of the league since its establishment. It began in late July 1995 and ended in June 1996.

League standing

Promotion play-offs

Relegation play-offs

See also
1995–96 Slovak Superliga

References
 Jindřich Horák, Lubomír Král: Encyklopedie našeho fotbalu, Libri 1997
 Igor Mráz: Päť rokov futbalu, SFZ 1998

2. Liga (Slovakia) seasons
2
Slovak